Amarnah or Amarine, also referred to as Tal al-Amara, is a Turkmen village in northern Aleppo Governorate, northern Syria.

With 1,050 inhabitants, as per the 2004 census, Amarnah administratively belongs to Nahiya Jarabulus within Jarabulus District. Nearby localities include al-Jamel  to the north, and Ayn al-Bayda  to the northeast.

References

Populated places in Jarabulus District
Turkmen communities in Syria